Tovey Battery was an artillery battery in the British Overseas Territory of Gibraltar.

Description
The battery is named after Colonel Tovey who was in Gibraltar and died here in November 1781 whilst he led the Royal Artillery during the Great Siege of Gibraltar.

Tovey battery had two 6 inch guns at the end of the nineteenth century which were part of fourteen available for close range defense. In 1911 Tovey's importance led to the closure of the inferior Hayne's Cave Battery which only had 4 inch guns.

The Tovey Battery had two six inch guns during World War II.

References

Batteries in Gibraltar